Sydney Football Club is an Australian association football club founded in 2004. In 2015, the club created a hall of fame into which personnel associated with the club are inducted from time to time.

The Hall of Fame is open to players, coaches, administrators, fans and volunteers. Players, coaches and administrators become eligible for induction upon their retirement or departure from the club. Years of service and total games played or coached are considerations, but not necessarily determinative in deciding who is selected. Selections are made by the Sydney FC board.

Australia international Alex Brosque is the most recent representative of the club to be inducted.

Members

See also 
 Football Federation Australia Hall of Fame

Footnotes

References

General

Specific

External links

Sydney FC
 Hall Of Fame
Sydney FC Hall Of Fame
Halls of fame in Australia
2015 establishments in Australia
Association football museums and halls of fame
Association football player non-biographical articles